In Mandaeism, various beings inhabit the World of Darkness.

Types
According to the Right Ginza, the World of Darkness consists of many demons, dewis, and evil spirits, including:

The Right Ginza describes them as:
{{columns-list|colwidth=30em|
haškia "gloomy"
ʿkumia "black"
ṭupšania "filthy"mriddia "rebellious"rgizia "furious"zidania "wrathful"zihirania "venomous"saklia "foolish"ndidia "repulsive"ṣahnia "stinking"zapuria "putrid"harašia "mute"ṭriṣia "deaf"ṭmimia "insensible"tahmia "dull"algia "stuttering"dugia "unhearing"gugia "babbling"pigia "idiots"šgišia "frightful"laiadita "ignorant"haṣipia "arrogant"hamimia "hot-headed"taqipia "powerful"haripia "harsh"rugzania "ill-tempered"raktania "lustful"bnia zma "children of blood"
}}

Demons in the Ginza Rabba
Main demons
Other than Ur, Ruha and her entourage of the 7 planets and 12 constellations, some infernal beings mentioned in the Ginza Rabba are:

Anathan (Anatan) – husband of Qin; described as a "warrior" and "war-like" in Book 5, Chapter 1 of the Right GinzaGaf and Gafan (Gap and Gapan)
Giu (Giuo)
Hag and Mag (Hagh and Magh) – a male and female pair of demons, respectively
Krun (Karun)
Qin – queen of darkness, mother of Ruha, grandmother of Ur; one of her epithets is Sumqaq
Shdum (Ashdum) – a ruler of the underworld
Zahreil (Zahrʿil) – daughter of Qin and wife of Hibil Ziwa
Zartai-Zartanai

Minor demons
Other demons mentioned in the Ginza Rabba are:
Aṭirpan (Aṭarpan), literally "foliage," mentioned with Lupan in Book 3 of the Right GinzaLupan, mentioned with Aṭirpan in Book 3 of the Right GinzaHimun, described as a "man" in Book 5, Chapter 2 and Book 6 of the Right Ginza; one of the matarta guards
Karipiun (Karafiun), described as a "devourer" in Book 5, Chapter 3 of the Right GinzaKarkum, described as a son of Ur in Book 4 of the Right GinzaShiqlun, mentioned in Book 15, Chapter 6 of the Right GinzaZamur, described as an "evil spirit" in Book 8 of the Right GinzaRight Ginza 5.1
In Book 5, Chapter 1 of the Right Ginza (also known as the "Book of the Underworld"), Hibil Ziwa descends the worlds of the "kings" and "giants of darkness" in the following order:
Zartai-Zartanai and his wife Amamit (an epithet of Libat, or Venus)
Hag and Mag, the two manas of darkness
Gap and Gapan, the mighty giants of darkness
Anatan and Qin
Šdum (Ašdum), king of darkness
Giu
Krun, King of Darkness, great mountain of flesh

Pillars of Jerusalem
In Book 15, Chapter 11 of the Right Ginza'', the pillars of Jerusalem are named as:
ʿUsraʿil (Israel)
Yaqip (Jacob)
Adunai (Adonai)
Zatan (Satan)
Ṣihmai
Karkum

Some of these names are also associated with beings in the World of Darkness, such as Karkum and Adunai (another name for Šamiš or the Sun).

Five Lords
Mandaeans also consider the "Five Lords of the World of Darkness" to be:
Zartai-Zartanai
Hag and Mag
Gap and Gapan
Šdum
Krun

The paired demons are considered to rule together as single lords, since Mag and Gapan are female consorts who are always with their male consorts Hag and Gap, respectively.

Skandola demons
Krun, Hag, and Ur are depicted on the skandola, a ritual talismanic seal used by Mandaeans to protect against evil.

See also
Incantation bowl
Mandaic lead rolls
List of Mandaean texts
Mesopotamian demons
Demons in Judaism
Christian demonology

References